Philippe Bozon (born November 30, 1966) is a former French professional ice hockey player who played for the St. Louis Blues in the National Hockey League (NHL) between the 1991–92 and 1994-95 seasons. He is the first of only seven French-born and trained players to appear in the NHL, the other six being Cristobal Huet, Stéphane Da Costa, Antoine Roussel, Pierre-Édouard Bellemare, Yohann Auvitu, and Alexandre Texier. He is currently the head coach for Boxers de Bordeaux of the Ligue Magnus.

Playing career
Bozon began his career playing for the St. Jean Beavers in the Quebec Major Junior Hockey League followed by four years competing in his native France. Playing for the Grenoble Brûleurs de Loups, he won the French championship in 1991. He was then recruited by the St. Louis Blues and was used as a defensive-minded forward and occasionally on the scoring line with Brett Hull. After his time with the Blues, Bozon played professionally in Germany and Switzerland. In Germany, his Adler Mannheim team won the league championship in 1997, 1998 and 1999.

International play

In addition to his professional career, Bozon appeared internationally for France, for which he competed in four Olympic Games.

Post-playing career
He was inducted into the IIHF Hall of Fame in 2008. On July 14, 2009, Bozon was named the head coach of the French national junior ice hockey team.

Family
Bozon is married to Hélène Barbier, who was an alpine skier. They have three children, sons Tim and Kevin, and daughter Allison. Both Tim and Kevin play professional hockey; Tim is with Genève-Servette HC of the National League and was selected by the Montreal Canadiens in the 2012 NHL Entry Draft, while Kevin is currently with EHC Winterthur of the Swiss League. Bozon's father, Alain Bozon, was also a hockey player, and was elected into the French Ice Hockey Hall of Fame in 2012.

Career statistics

Regular season and playoffs

International

References

1966 births
Living people
Adler Mannheim players
Brûleurs de Loups players
Chamonix HC players
France men's national ice hockey team coaches
French expatriate ice hockey people
French expatriate sportspeople in Canada
French expatriate sportspeople in the United States
French ice hockey coaches
French ice hockey left wingers
Genève-Servette HC players
HC La Chaux-de-Fonds players
HC Lugano players
Ice hockey players at the 1988 Winter Olympics
Ice hockey players at the 1992 Winter Olympics
Ice hockey players at the 1998 Winter Olympics
Ice hockey players at the 2002 Winter Olympics
IIHF Hall of Fame inductees
Olympic ice hockey players of France
People from Chamonix
Peoria Rivermen (IHL) players
Saint-Jean Castors players
St. Louis Blues players
Undrafted National Hockey League players
Sportspeople from Haute-Savoie